The 1903 Sewanee Tigers football team represented the Sewanee Tigers of Sewanee: The University of the South in the 1903 Southern Intercollegiate Athletic Association football season.

Schedule

Season summary

Mooney
The season opened with a defeat of Mooney School by a 23–0 score.

Tennessee Medical
The Tennessee Medicos were beaten 6–0.

Cumberland

Sewanee gave the greatest team in Cumberland history its only loss.. Henry D. Phillips plowed through the line for the deciding score.

The starting lineup was Wheless (left end), L. Kirby-Smith (left tackle), Blount (left guard), Watkins (center), Phillips (right guard), Brong (right tackle), Jones (right end), Scarbrough (quarterback), Colmore (left halfback), E. Kirby Smith (right halfback), Stewart (fullback).

Auburn

Sewanee easily beat Auburn 47–0. The first half was all Sewanee. Phillips made the first touchdown. After an Auburn fumble, Shaffer made the next touchdown. Phillips soon made the next touchdown. Kirby-Smith the next. In the second half, Auburn played better, but got nowhere near Sewanee's goal. Phillips had three touchdowns in the second half, "by some of the finest line bucking ever seen here."

The starting lineup was Wheless (left end), L. Kirby-Smith (left tackle), Harper (left guard), Watkins (center), Phillips (right guard), Brong (right tackle), Jones (right end), Scarbrough (quarterback), Colmore (left halfback), Shaffer (right halfback), Stewart (fullback).

Alabama
Sewanee beat Alabama 23–0 in the first match between the two schools since 1896. The game was originally scheduled to be played in Tuscaloosa, but was subsequently moved to West End Park in  Birmingham in an effort to increase gate receipts.  Phillips made the first score.

The starting lineup was Wheless (left end), Brong (left tackle), Harper (left guard), Watkins (center), Phillips (right guard), L. Kirby-Smith (right tackle), Jones (right end), Scarbrough (quarterback), Colmore (left halfback), E. Kirby Smith (right halfback), Stewart (fullback).

Nashville
Sewanee defeated the Nashville Garnet and Blue 6–0. In 1903, Wreidt, the team's coach, resigned and Nashville football was threatened with its end, but it survived for a few more years.

Tennessee
Tennessee was beaten 17–0.

Vanderbilt

Sewanee was defeated by rival Vanderbilt, 10–5, the first team to even score on the Tigers. Sewanee was crippled in the first half by the loss of Stewart, who fractured his ankle in a scrimmage before the game. He tried to play through it, but had to be helped off the field. John J. Tigert, later a prominent educator, got Vanderbilt's first touchdown. Sewanee tied the score with a touchdown in the second half. Later, Vanderbilt had the ball at the 4-yard line third down. "As great a stand of a football elevve was that of Sewaee before Vanderbilt's winning touchdown was made." On third down from the 1-yard line the center Perry fell on a fumble. Sewanee protested that the runner was down, but Vanderbilt was awarded the touchdown. "Vanderbilt, in fact all Nashville, is wild with joy tonight. Sewanee is looking forward to next Thanksgiving."

The starting lineup was Wheless (left end), Brong (left tackle), Harper (left guard), Watkins (center), Phillips (right guard), E. Kirby-Smith (right tackle), Jones (right end), Scarbrough (quarterback), Sawrie (left halfback), Colmore (right halfback), Stewart (fullback).

Players

Varsity lettermen

Line

Backfield

Subs

References

Sewanee
Sewanee Tigers football seasons
Sewanee Tigers football